Numerous castles (Burgen) and palaces (Schlösser) are found in the German state of Hesse. These buildings, some of which have a history of over 1000 years, were the setting of historical events, domains of famous personalities and are still imposing buildings to this day.

This list encompasses castles described in German as Burg (castle), Festung (fort/fortress), Schloss and Palais/Palast (palace). Many German castles after the middle ages were mainly built as royal or ducal palaces rather than as a fortified building.

Darmstadt

 Residential Palace Darmstadt, Darmstadt
 Kranichstein Hunting Lodge, Kranichstein
 Frankenstein Castle, Mühltal

Frankfurt am Main
 Höchst Castle, Höchst

Offenbach am Main
 Isenburg Castle, Offenbach
 Rumpenheim Castle, Offenbach
 Büsing Palace, Offenbach

Wiesbaden
 Biebrich Palace, Biebrich
 Frauenstein Castle, Frauenstein
 Platte Hunting Lodge, Wiesbaden
 Wiesbaden City Palace, Wiesbaden

Landkreis Bergstraße

 Schloss Auerbach, Bensheim
 Schloss Birkenau, Birkenau
 Staatspark Fürstenlager, Bensheim
 Heppenheimer Stadtschloss, Heppenheim
 Hinterburg, Neckarsteinach
 Hirschburg, Hirschberg
 Burg Hirschhorn, Hirschhorn
 Burg Hundheim, Neckarsteinach
 Kurmainzer Amtshof, Heppenheim
 Burg Lindenfels, Lindenfels
 Mittelburg, Neckarsteinach
 Neuschloss, Lampertheim
 Schloss Rennhof, Lampertheim
 Schwalbennest, Neckarsteinach
 Schloss Schönberg, Bensheim
 Starkenburg, Heppenheim
 Burg Stein, Biblis
 Vorderburg, Neckarsteinach
 Schloss Wiser, Hirschberg

Landkreis Darmstadt-Dieburg
 Schloss Alsbach, Alsbach-Hähnlein
 Bickenbach Castle, Alsbach-Hähnlein
 Schloss Braunshardt, Braunshardt
 Dieburg Castle, Dieburg
 Schloss Fechenbach, Dieburg
 Frankenstein Castle, Mühltal
 Schloss Heiligenberg, Seeheim-Jugenheim
 Jossa Castlt, Seeheim-Jugenheim
 Schloss Lichtenberg, Fischbachtal
 Otzberg Castle, Otzberg
 Wasserburg Schloß-Nauses, Otzberg
 Schloss Stockau, Dieburg

Landkreis Groß-Gerau
 Jagdschloss Mönchbruch, Mörfelden-Walldorf

Hochtaunuskreis
 Burg Altweilnau, Weilrod
 Burgruine Falkenstein, Königstein
 Burgruine Hattstein, Schmitten
 Schloss Homburg „Friedrichsburg“, Bad Homburg
 Burg Königstein, Königstein
 Burg Kronberg, Königstein
 Schloss Neuweilnau, Weilrod
 Burg Nürings, Königstein
 Burg Reifenberg, Schmitten
 Kransberg Castle, Usingen

Main-Kinzig-Kreis
 Dorfelden Castle, Niederdorfelden
 Pfalz Gelnhausen, Gelnhausen
 Huttenburg, Sinntal
 Schloss Philippsruhe, Hanau
 Ronneburg Castle, Ronneburg
 Schwarzenfels Castle, Sinntal
 Steckelberg Castle, Schlüchtern
 Brandenstein Castle, Schlüchtern
 Schloss Birstein, Birstein
 Isenburger Schloss, Wächtersbach
 Schloss Ramholz, Ramholz

Main-Taunus-Kreis
 Burg Eppstein, Eppstein

Odenwaldkreis
 Burg Breuberg, Breuberg
 Burg Freienstein, Beerfelden
 Burg Rodenstein, Fränkisch-Crumbach
 Burg Schnellerts, Fränkisch-Crumbach
 Wehrkirchhof Bad König, Bad König

Landkreis Offenbach
 Hayn Castle, Dreieich
 Schloss Wolfsgarten, Langen
 Schloss Schönborn, Heusenstamm
 Castle in the Hayn, Obertshausen

Rheingau-Taunus-Kreis
 Boosenburg, Rüdesheim
 Brömserburg, Rüdesheim
 , Eltville
 Ehrenfels Castle, Rüdesheim
 Stadtburg Eltville, Eltville
 Haneck Castle, Lorch
 Hattenheim Castle, Eltville
 Hohenstein Castle, Bad Schwalbach
 Schloss Johannisberg, Geisenheim
 Idstein Castle, Idstein
 Lauksburg, Lorch
 Nollig Castle, Lorch
 Schloss Reichartshausen, Oestrich-Winkel
 Schloss Reinhartshausen, Eltville
 Rheinberg Castle, Lorch
 Scharfenstein Castle, Kiedrich
 Schwarzenstein, Geisenheim
 Turmburg, Walluf
 Schloss Vollrads, Oestrich-Winkel
 Waldeck Castle, Lorch
 Wallrabenstein Castle, Hünstetten

Wetteraukreis
 Büdingen Manor, Büdingen
 Friedberg Castle, Friedberg
 Lindheim Castle, Altenstadt
 Lißberg Castle, Ortenberg
 Münzenberg Castle, Münzenberg
 Rockenberg Castle, Rockenberg
 Vilbel Castle, Bad Vilbel

Landkreis Gießen
 Arnsburg Castle, Lich
 Badenburg, Gießen
 Cleeberg Castle, Langgöns
 Gleiberg Castle, Wettenberg
 Altes Gronauer Schloss, Lollar
 Grüningen Castle, Pohlheim
 Altes Schloss, Gießen
 Nordeck Castle, Allendorf (Lumda)
 Staufenberg Castle, Staufenberg
 Vetzberg Castle, Biebertal
 Warnsberg Castle, Lich
 Neues Schloss, Gießen
 Schloss der Fürsten zu Solms Hohensolms Lich, Lich

Lahn-Dill-Kreis

 Beilstein Castle, Greifenstein
 Schloss Braunfels, Braunfels
 Oberburg Driedorf, Driedorf
 Greifenstein Castle, Greifenstein
 Schloss Herborn, Herborn
 Hermannstein Castle, Wetzlar
 Hohensolms Castle, Hohenahr
 Junkernschloss, Driedorf
 Lichtenstein Castle, Greifenstein
 Kalsmunt Castle, Wetzlar
 Philippstein Castle, Braunfels
 Tringenstein Castle, Siegbach

Landkreis Limburg-Weilburg
 Alte Burg (Elbtal Hessen), Elbtal
 Burg Elkerhausen, Weinbach
 Burg Ellar, Waldbrunn
 Burg Freienfels, Weinbach
 Schloss Hadamar, Hadamar
 Burg Kirberg, Kirberg
 Burg Laneburg, Löhnberg
 Burg Limburg, Limburg
 Maienburg, Mengerskirchen
 Schloss Mengerskirchen, Mengerskirchen
 Burg Merenberg, Merenberg
 Burg Neu-Elkerhausen, Runkel
 Burg Runkel, Runkel
 Burg Schadeck, Runkel
 Burg Waldmannshausen, Elbtal
 Schloss Weilburg, Weilburg

Landkreis Marburg-Biedenkopf

 Burg Amöneburg, Amöneburg
 Schloss Biedenkopf, Biedenkopf
 Burg Blankenstein, Gladenbach
 Burg Breidenbach, Breidenbach
 Schloss Breidenstein, Biedenkopf
 Burg Buchenau, Dautphetal
 Burg Bürgeln, Cölbe
 Burg (Caldern), Lahntal
 Christenberg, Münchhausen
 Burg Neu-Dernbach, Gladenbach
 Burg Ebsdorf, Ebsdorfergrund
 Burg Elnhausen, Marburg
 Eselsburg, Lohra
 Burg Etzgerode, Neustadt
 Hof Fleckenbühl, Cölbe
 Burg Forst, Neustadt
 Burg Frauenberg, Ebsdorfergrund
 Schloss Fronhausen, Fronhausen
 Burg Goßfelden, Lahntal
 Burg Hohenfels, Dautphetal
 Burg Hollende, Wetter
 Hunburg (Betziesdorf), Kirchhain
 Hunburg (Burgholz), Kirchhain
 Burg Hundsbach, Rauschenberg
 Burg Hundsgeweide, Amöneburg
 Kassenburg, Marburg
 Jagdschloss Katzenbach, Biedenkopf
 Burg Kirchhain, Kirchhain
 Burg Leiterstädt, Kirchhain
 Lüneburg (Mellnau), Wetter
 Landgrafenschloss Marburg, Marburg
 Burg Mellnau, Wetter
 Burg Momberg, Neustadt
 Burg Münchhausen (Stadtallendorf), Stadtallendorf
 Burg Naumburg, Gladenbach
 Nellenburg (Neustadt), Neustadt
 Hof Netz, Kirchhain
 Schloss Neustadt, Neustadt
 Burg Niederasphe, Münchhausen
 Burg Niederklein, Stadtallendorf
 Burg Offenhausen, Lohra
 Burg Radenhausen, Amöneburg
 Schloss Rauischholzhausen, Ebsdorfergrund
 Burg Rauschenberg, Rauschenberg
 Burg Rickelskopf, Weimar
 Burgwüstung Röderburg, Ebsdorfergrund
 Schloss Schönstadt, Cölbe
 Burg Schweinsberg (Hessen), Stadtallendorf
 Burg Stedebach, Weimar
 Burg Trugelrode, Neustadt
 Burg Waffensand, Stadtallendorf
 Burg Weissenstein, Marburg
 Wenigenburg, Amöneburg

Vogelsbergkreis
 Schloss Eisenbach, Lauterbach
 Burg Homberg, Homberg
 Burg Lehrbach, Kirtorf
 Burg Seeburg, Schlitz
 Burg Schmitthof, Kirtorf
 Burgruine Wartenberg, Wartenberg
 Schloss Romrod, Romrod

Kassel
 Löwenburg, Kassel
 Schloss Wilhelmshöhe, Kassel

Landkreis Fulda
 Stadtschloss Fulda, Fulda
 Schloss Fasanerie, Eichenzell
 Eichenzeller (Renaissance) Schlösschen, Eichenzell
 Schloss Buchenau, Eiterfeld
 Buchenau Castle, Eiterfeld
 Fürsteneck Castle, Eiterfeld
 Bieberstein Palace, Hesse, Hofbieber
 Gelbes Schloss, Tann
 Barockschloss, Gersfeld
 Schlossanlage mit Herrenhaus, Burghaun
 Haselstein Castle, Nüsttal
 Wartenberg Castle, Bad Salzschlirf
 Auersberg Castle, Hilders
 Ebersburg Castle, Ebersburg
 Eberstein Castle (Hilders), Hilders
 Milseburg Castle, Rhön
 Rabenstein Castle, Rhön
 Wüstung Moordorf, Rhön
 Schwedenschanze, Rhön

Landkreis Hersfeld-Rotenburg
 Burgruine Altwehrda, Wehrda
 Schloss Blumenstein und Burg Wildeck, Wildeck
 Burgruine Dreienburg, above Friedewald-Lautenhausen
 Schloss Eichhof, Bad Hersfeld
 Wasserburg Friedewald, Friedewald
 Burg Hauneck, Haunetal
 Burg Herzberg, Breitenbach a. Herzberg
 Schloss Hohenwehrda, Wehrda
 Burgruine Landeck, Schenklengsfeld
 Schloss Ludwigseck, Ludwigsau
 Burgruine Milnrode, above Bad Hersfeld-Asbach
 Burg Neuenstein, Neuenstein
 Schloss Philippsthal, Philippsthal
 Schloss Rotenburg, Rotenburg a.d. Fulda
 Sinzigburg, Haunetal-Rhina
 Burg Tannenberg, Nentershausen

Landkreis Kassel
 Burgruine Falkenberg, Zierenberg
 Burgruine Falkenstein, between Bad Emstal and Niedenstein
 Burg Grebenstein, Grebenstein
 Burgruine Igelsburg, Habichtswald
 Krukenburg, Bad Karlshafen
 Burgruine Landsberg, Wolfhagen
 Burgruine Malsburg, Zierenberg
 Schloss Riede, Bad Emstal
 Burgruine Rodersen, Wolfhagen
 Sababurg, Hofgeismar
 Burgruine Schartenberg, Zierenberg
 Burgruine Schauenburg, Schauenburg
 Burg Trendelburg, Trendelburg
 Weidelsburg, Wolfhagen
 Schloss Wilhelmsthal, Calden
 Wasserschloss Wülmersen, Trendelburg

Schwalm-Eder-Kreis
 Altenburg, Felsberg-Altenburg
 Altenburg, Niedenstein
 Burg Falkenberg, Wabern
 Felsburg, Felsberg
 Schloss Garvensburg, Fritzlar-Züschen
 Kalbsburg, Großenenglis
 Schloss Hausen, Oberaula-Hausen
 Schloss Haydau, Morschen-Altmorschen
 Burg Heiligenberg, Felsberg
 Hohenburg, Homberg (Efze)
 Burg Jesberg, Jesberg
 Burg Löwenstein, Bad Zwesten-Schiffelborn
 Burg Niederurff, Bad Zwesten-Niederurff
 Obernburg, Gudensberg
 Jagdschloss Oberurff, Bad Zwesten-Oberurff
 Burg Schönstein, Gilserberg
 Schloss Spangenberg, Spangenberg
 Burgruine Wallenstein, Knüllwald
 Schloss Wabern, Wabern
 Wenigenburg, Gudensberg
 Schloss Ziegenhain, Schwalmstadt-Ziegenhain

Landkreis Waldeck-Frankenberg

 Schloss Arolsen, Bad Arolsen
 Burg Aue, Wanfried
 Burg am Backofen, Vöhl-Schmittlotheim
 Burgruine Bringhausen, Edertal-Bringhausen
 Burgruine Eisenberg, Korbach
 Schloss Friedrichstein, Bad Wildungen
 Burg Hessenstein, Vöhl
 Itterburg, Vöhl
 Kellerburg, Battenberg
 Keseburg, Vöhl
 Kugelsburg, Volkmarsen
 Burg Lichtenfels, Lichtenfels
 Schloss Reckenberg, Lichtenfels
 Schloss Waldeck, Waldeck

Werra-Meißner-Kreis
 Aue Castle, Wanfried
 Schloss Berlepsch, Witzenhausen
 Bilstein Castle, Eschwege
 Boyneburg, Sontra
 Brandenfels Castle, Herleshausen
 Landgrafenschloss Eschwege, Eschwege
 Fürstenstein Castle, Eschwege
 Gelsterburg, Großalmerode
 Ludwigstein Castle, Witzenhausen
 Schloss Rothestein, Bad Sooden-Allendorf
 Schwebda Castle, Meinhard
 Schloss Willershausen, Herleshausen
 Schloss Wolfsbrunnen, Eschwege
 Ziegenberg Castle, Witzenhausen

See also 
 List of castles
 List of castles in Germany

Further reading
 Rudolf Knappe: Mittelalterliche Burgen in Hessen : 800 Burgen, Burgruinen und Burgstätten. 2. Aufl. Wartberg-Verlag. Gudensberg-Gleichen 1995.

External links